CIRAS can mean:

 Combat Integrated Releasable Armor System, a modular protective vest designed for US Special Operations Forces 
 Confidential Incident Reporting & Analysis System, a confidential safety reporting service for all workers in the United Kingdom rail industry
Center for Industrial Research and Service (CIRAS) at Iowa State University (ISU)